Darkness At Noon is a solo album by Richard H. Kirk of Cabaret Voltaire. Released originally by Touch Records Recorded at Western Works Studios, Sheffield, England, as part of a performance for Phonotaktik, Wien, Austria, April 1999. 
Licensed from Alphaphone Recordings, Sheffield.

Track listing
"Darkness At Noon" (38:00)

Personnel
Produced and recorded by Richard H. Kirk

References

1999 albums
Richard H. Kirk albums